SuperNova 2 can refer to:
Type II supernova
Dance Dance Revolution SuperNova 2, the Japanese version of the game
Dance Dance Revolution SuperNova 2 (2007 video game), the North American edition